Kıbrıs (meaning Cyprus) is a daily newspaper published in Northern Cyprus. It has been published since 1989. Its editor in chief is Uğur Kaptanoğlu and its owner is Asil Nadir. It has by far the highest circulation in the country. Its former editor in chief Reşat Akar went on to create the Diyalog newspaper.

See also 
 List of newspapers in Northern Cyprus

References 

Newspapers published in Northern Cyprus